This page lacks images; please help Wikipedia by Uploading your images to Commons

This list is of the Cultural Properties of Tōdai-ji, Nara, Japan.

Structures

Paintings

Sculptures

Crafts

Documents

Monuments

See also
 Cultural Properties of Japan
 List of National Treasures of Japan (temples)
 List of National Treasures of Japan (paintings)
 List of National Treasures of Japan (sculptures)
 List of National Treasures of Japan (crafts: others)
 List of National Treasures of Japan (archaeological materials)
 List of National Treasures of Japan (ancient documents)
 List of National Treasures of Japan (writings: others)
 Monuments of Japan

References

External links
 Plan of Todaiji

Buddhist temples in Nara, Nara
Nara